is a Japanese pop singer. She is one of the long-time vocalists of the FictionJunction project started by Yuki Kajiura; joining the group in 2005.  She has performed a number of theme songs for anime television series including Tsubasa: Reservoir Chronicle, Baccano! and Tenchi Muyo!; and for video games by Otomate including the Amnesia series. She has released five solo albums that have charted on Oricon.

Biography 
In 2005, Oda became involved in a music project called Harajuku BJ Girls, later named Chix Chicks. She also started collaborating with Yuki Kajiura under the project name FictionJunction Kaori. She sang on the insert songs "Tsubasa" and "Dream Scape" for the anime television series Tsubasa: Reservoir Chronicle. As part of FictionJunction, she has been a regular vocalist on their albums and concerts, and attended Anime Expo 2012 in the US as part of the group.

She also joined the Japanese fantasy music group Sound Horizon in 2006 and sang in their hit single "Shonen wa Tsurugi wo..." as well as tracks on their story CD albums Roman and Moira.

In 2007, she had her solo debut with the single "Brilliant World", which was the theme song for the video game Luminous Arc. Her second single, "Calling", was used as an ending theme to the anime television series Baccano! In 2011, she announced she had graduated from university.

She joined TEAM Entertainment in 2012. Her first solo album. Place, released in February 6, 2013, includes songs since "Brilliant World" as well as original works. She held her first solo live concert on April 14.

Her third single, "Akatsuki no Butterfly", released in 2013, was used in the Amnesia video game series title Amnesia Crowd. Her fourth single, "Reverberation" was used for Amnesia V Edition. Her fifth single, "Hana wa Utsutsu ni", was used as a theme song for the video game Shinobi, Koi Utsutsu. Her second album, Colors, was released in 2014 and reached No. 58 on the Oricon charts. She promoted the album by hosting a radio show called Colorful Mode Nippon Cultural Broadcasting's A&G Artist Zone network.

Oda released her sixth single "Tsuiso Kanon" later in 2014, and that contained more Amnesia theme songs including for Amnesia World. She performed at Connichi 2014, an anime convention in Germany. In 2015, she released her seventh single "Futari Ayatori" which was used for the video game Shinobi, Koi Utsutsu -Setsugetsuka Koi Emaki. Her single "Zero Tokei", released February 10, 2016, was used as the theme song for the Norn9 anime television series. She released her third album, Make It, in April, and held her 9th solo live concert in August. In September, she joined fellow Sound Horizon vocalist Haruka Shimotsuki on the latter's 10th Anniversary Live Tour in Taiwan.

Her single "Mugen no Dystopia" was released in 2016 and was the theme song for a smartphone video game Yodohoshi Dystopia. Her singles "Theatrium", "Run-Limit" were used as a character CDs of the similarly named series. She released her fourth album, Gift in 2017. and also had a 10th anniversary concert called 10th Birthday Solo Live. On radio, she promoted her works on the A&G Artist Zone show. In 2018, she released several songs "Suibi", "Towa no Yakusoku", and "Utakata", which were used in the Otomate video game Tensei ni mai, Sui na Hana. She released her compilation album The Best -Replay- which peaked at No. 66 on Oricon. On September 20, 2018, Oda announced on her Lineblog that she left the Space Craft agency, having been with them for 20 years including her time with Tokyo Children's Theater Company.

She sang the ending theme for the fifth Tenchi Muyo! Ryo-Ohki OVA series that was released in 2020. She also released her fifth solo album, Flowers, which reached No. 100 on Oricon.

Discography

Solo singles

Solo albums

Compilation albums

References

External links 

  
 Kaori Oda profile at Oricon
 Kaori Oda profile at Space Craft (archive)

Living people
Japanese women pop singers
21st-century Japanese singers
Anime singers
Yuki Kajiura
21st-century Japanese women singers
Year of birth missing (living people)